Hettiarachchige Reginald Jothipala (12 February 1936 – 7 July 1987), popularly as H. R. Jothipala, was a Sri Lankan playback singer in the Sinhala cinema as well as a film actor. Considered as the best playback singer in Sri Lankan film history, Jothipala lent his voice to all classes of actors ranging from Eddie Jayamanne to Ranjan Ramanayake. He also worked as an opera singer. He died in July 1987 at the age of 51 year from cardiac arrest.

Personal life 
Jothipala was born on 12 February 1936 in Dematagoda, Colombo, Sri Lanka as the first child in a middle-class family. His father H. R. James was a tailor in Matara and mother Ahaliyagoda H. K. Podinona Perera was a nurse. Their home town is Matara, Sri Lanka & They later moved to Colombo. He attended St. Lawrence College in Maradana and St. John's College in Dematagoda. He has four younger sisters and one younger brother. 

Jothipala would visit tea kiosks to hear music as his family didn't own a radio. He cleaned medicine bottles at the Sulaiman Hospital on Armor Street, Colombo. Later he worked as the peon in M. D. Gunasena and the company.

He was married to Blossom Winter, they had four daughters together. He came to be known by his initials "H. R." and was loved as "Hadhavatha Raththaran Jothipala", meaning "golden-hearted Jothipala", due to his kindness to people of all ages, communities, and families.

Career

Early days
Nadarajah, one of the best radio tabla players in the country at the time, was living at Kosgas Junction in Grandpass, Colombo. One day he heard Jothipala singing and chose to sing Hindi songs at the weddings of the Colombo aristocracy. B. S. Perera, the famous film music director who was the head of the radio orchestra who first recognized Jothipala's talents. In 1952, there was a program on the radio called 'Adhunika Peya', which showcased the talents of amateur singers, courtesy of the Queen Sweets Company. He competed in this competition and became the winner. From there he went to the radio program "Jayagrahi Pelapaliya" and won first place.

In 1955, he missed three golden opportunities to become a playback singer. At first, he went to meet Wimalaweera master who composed music for the film Podi Putha. During the audition, Wimalaweera informed Jothipala that his voice is not right, where it trembles and not sweet. In February, Jothipala and Chandrasena went Negombo and met B. A. W. Jayamanne and Rukmani Devi. Even though they satisfied about his voice, Jothipala could not go to India for playback as he did not have a passport. In the third time, he met A. B. Raj, director of the film Perakadoru Bena. He refused Jothipala due to having rough voice.

Jothipala made his debut as a playback singer on Cyril P. Abeyratne's Surathalee, singing "Siriyame Sara", in 1956.  Jothipala has said that he contemplated taking his life when he went with his friends to watch Podi Putha and found out that his song was not included. Later when Surathalee producer Jabir A. Cader wanted to hear one of his songs to consider him for the film, Jothipala almost passed on the offer as he did not possess enough money to create a record. He was helped out by veteran musician Stanley Omar who financed him for the sum of 35 rupees – a large amount of money at the time. Jothipala's song on the film, "Siriyame Sara," still remains popular in Sri Lanka, having recorded the popular number under the direction of T.R. Papa at Wahini Studio in India.

Jothipala has worked with many reputed directors of Sri Lanka. In the early stages of his prolific career, Jothipala got the chance to work with the prolific filmmaker, Lester James Peries on the movie Sandeshaya. Jothipala sang the song "Puruthugeesi Karaya" for the film, which was composed by the legendary Sunil Santha and written by veteran lyricist Arisen Ahubudu.

Success
Jothipala was the undisputed choice in films that were made in the late sixties and through the seventies, the period during which he also began to act. Though Jothi was criticized for singing to the tunes of popular Hindi songs, particularly of Mohammed Rafi, he also sang under the batons of P.V. Nandasiri, Premasiri Khemadasa, Sarath Dassanayake and Milton Mallawarachchi. Jothipala is considered the backbone of Sri Lankan playback singing. He has voiced a wide array of actors across many decades in his era. Apart from singing, he also acted in 33 films.

He sang in hundreds of films including popular hits like Kasthuri Suwanda, Thushara, Sweeep Ticket, Hitha Honda Minihek, Kawuda Raja, Hondata Hondai, Wasana, Sangeetha and others. The award-winning singer also played some memorable roles in films including Ethulweema Thahanam, Sulalitha Sobani, Sujeewa, Sukiri Kella, Abirahasa, Bonikka, Shanthi and his own production Sumithuro and Obai Mamai. He made his film debut as an actor in 1963 with a lame character in the film Sudu Sande Kalu Wala and later played mostly villain characters.

Although Jothipala was very talented in his own respect, he was criticized for singing to the tunes of popular Hindi songs, particularly of Mohammed Rafi. Jothipala sang many duets with Sujatha Attanayake and Latha Walpola,'but largely with Angeline Gunathilake. Jothipala's best friend was the then popular singer J. A. Milton Perera. In the late 1950s, the duo debated their theme song "Anangaya" cult on the radio commercial service. Jothipala won the Best Singer award for his song "Mee Jeevanaye" from the 1974 film Onna Babo Billo Enawa. At the 1983 Sarasaviya Awards, Jothipala won the Award for Best Singer for the song "Sara Sande" from the film Meedum Sihina and for the song "Paalu Susane" from the 1986 film Obata Divana Kiyannam.

The Sinhala Baila song Pissu Vikare (Dagena Polkatu Male) by H. R. Jothipala, Milton Perera, M. S. Fernando is a cover version of the Tamil song Dingiri Dingale (Meenachi) from the 1958 Tamil film Anbu Engey. And it was covered again in Sinhala as a folk song named Digisi/Digiri Digare (Kussiye Badu).

Death
Two days before his death, on 5 July 1987, he participated in "Gam Udaawa", a patriotic project by late President Ranasinghe Premadasa, and sang on his final open stage. But while singing he felt pain but finished the singing successfully. The next day he was admitted to the hospital. Jothipala died on 7 July 1987 at Ratnams Private Hospital. The cause of his death was said to be liver failure. "He came to our hospital very regularly. Ramya Fleming was in charge of the ICU and was at home when she got the call to come in. As soon as news spread of Jothipala's death, people surrounded Ratnams Private Hospital. All of Union Square was filled with fans, and some even jumped over the hospital gate just to get a glimpse of Jothipala.

Numerous activities are still underway throughout the country for his commemorations.

Filmography and Playback singing

Notes

External links 
 H. R. Jothipala's page on Sinhala Jukebox
 Jothi: Making waves then and now
 H R Jothipala on You tube
 ගී සෑයක සැතපුණු ජෝතිපාල
 ජෝතිපාලයන්ගේ සමරුවට පුෂ්පෝපහාරයක්

1936 births
1987 deaths
Sri Lankan Buddhists
Sri Lankan playback singers
20th-century Sri Lankan male singers
Sinhalese singers